Gibbula sementis is a species of sea snail, a marine gastropod mollusk in the family Trochidae, the top snails.

Description
The height of the shell attains 6.1 mm.

Distribution
This species occurs in the Atlantic Ocean off the islands of Santiago and Brava, Cape Verde.

References

sementis
Gastropods described in 2001
Gastropods of Cape Verde